The Capertee River, a perennial stream that is part of the Hawkesbury-Nepean catchment, is located in the Central Tablelands region of New South Wales, Australia.

Course
The Capertee River rises on the Great Dividing Range, close to Bogee, southeast of Kandos, formed by the confluence of the Tea Tree Creek and Brymair Creek, and flows through the Capertee Valley, generally to the south, east, and southeast, joined by seven minor tributaries, to its confluence with Wolgan River to form the Colo River, northeast of Newnes. The river descends  over its  course.

See also 

 List of rivers of Australia
 List of rivers of New South Wales (A–K)
 Rivers of New South Wales
 Wollemi National Park

References 

Rivers of New South Wales
Central Tablelands